"A Pittance of Time" is a 2002 Canadian folk song by Terry Kelly and produced by Jefter Publishing – SOCAN. Kelly's intent in writing the song was to remind people to observe the two-minute silence on Remembrance Day, after he saw a man in a shop failing to do so.

History 
On 11 November 1999, Kelly was in a drug store which announced over the public address system that they would be observing the two-minutes silence at 11 a.m. for Remembrance. Kelly observed the silence but noticed a man in the queue in front of him demanding that the clerk run his shopping through during the silence. Kelly also noted that the man's daughter chastised him afterwards by saying: "Daddy, you were supposed to be quiet through that time". Kelly's anger about the lack of respect led him to write "A Pittance of Time" as a plea for people to observe the two-minute silence on Remembrance Day.

Kelly recorded the song in 2002 with the lyrics being written to remind people of the sacrifices that the British Empire and Commonwealth forces made during the war for their freedom. Kelly also wrote a French language version of the song titled "C'est Si Peu de Temps".

The song was also used as the inspiration for a campaign for Canadian shops not to put up Christmas displays until after Remembrance Day. It was led by the businessman and Dragon's Den panellist W. Brett Wilson who was inspired by "A Pittance of Time" and felt that the excessively early Christmas displays were disrespecting the memory of the veterans. He called for shops to wait until after 11 November before putting up Christmas displays.

References 

Canadian folk songs
2002 songs
Commemoration